The Government of Indianapolis—officially the Consolidated City of Indianapolis and Marion County—is a strong-mayor form of mayor-council government system. Local government is headquartered downtown at the City-County Building.

Since 1970, Indianapolis and Marion County have operated as a consolidated city-county government called Unigov. The executive branch is headed by the mayor who serves as the chief executive and administrative officer for both the city and county. The Indianapolis City-County Council is a unicameral legislative body consisting of 25 members, each elected from a geographic district. The mayor and council members are elected to unlimited four-year terms. The judicial branch consists of the Marion Circuit and Superior Courts. The municipal budget for 2022 was $1.3 billion. The city-county government employs about 8,000 full-time employees.

Marion County contains nine civil townships that function independently from the city-county government under Indiana Code. Each township consists of an elected township trustee, three-member board, assessor, and a constable and small claims court judge, all of whom serve four-year terms.

History

Citizens Energy Group is responsible for city water, wastewater, and stormwater systems. These were previously operated by the City's Department of Waterworks through a contract with Veolia. However, the transfer of the water and wastewater systems to Citizens Energy Group was approved by the Indiana Utility Regulatory Commission on July 13, 2011. The transfer of the systems to Citizens Energy Group was completed on August 26, 2011. Citizens is a public charitable trust that is operated for the benefit of its customers; it was acquired by the city of Indianapolis in 1933.

Executive branch

City administration
Despite the nature of a unified city-county government, several bureaucratic functions remain separate. For example, Marion County's nine civil townships retained autonomy under Unigov. This resulted in maintaining separate public services, such as independent school districts or fire departments, that would have otherwise been consolidated into single entities.

Office of the Mayor

The Mayor of Indianapolis is the chief executive and administrative officer of both the city and county. The mayor's chief duties include ensuring city-county ordinances are executed and enforced in accordance with applicable state and local law; appointing department heads and one or more deputy mayors, subject to City-County Council approval; and supervising the work of the city-county's departments, special taxing districts, and special service districts. The mayor is directly elected by popular vote for four-year, unlimited terms.

Departments

 Indianapolis Department of Business and Neighborhood Services (BNS)
 Indianapolis Department of Metropolitan Development (DMD)
 Indianapolis Department of Parks and Recreation (Indy Parks)
 Indianapolis Department of Public Works (DPW)
 Indianapolis Fire Department (IFD)
 Indianapolis Metropolitan Police Department (IMPD)

Offices

 Office of Audit and Performance
 Office of Corporation Counsel
 Office of Education Innovation
 Office of Finance and Management (City Controller)
 Office of Minority and Women Business Development
 Office of Public Health and Safety

County administration
Heads of county offices are elected by the citizens of both Indianapolis and Marion County.

Offices

 Marion County Assessor's Office
 Marion County Auditor's Office
 Marion County Clerk's Office
 Marion County Coroner's Office
 Marion County Prosecutor's Office
 Marion County Recorder's Office
 Marion County Sheriff's Office
 Marion County Surveyor's Office
 Marion County Treasurer's Office

Boards and agencies

 Marion County Board of Commissioners
 Marion County Board of Voters Registration
 Marion County Election Board
 Marion County Public Defender Agency
 State of Indiana Division of Family Resources
 Indianapolis–Marion County Forensic Services Agency
 Information Services Agency

Municipal corporations
The city-county contains seven independent municipal corporations established by Indiana Code.

 Capital Improvement Board of Marion County (CIB)
 Health and Hospital Corporation of Marion County (HHC)
 Indianapolis Airport Authority
 Indianapolis–Marion County Building Authority
 Indianapolis–Marion County Public Library
 Indianapolis Public Improvement Bond Bank
 Indianapolis Public Transportation Corporation (IndyGo)

Legislative branch

Indianapolis City-County Council serves as the legislative body for both Indianapolis and Marion County. The council is composed of 25 members elected to four-year renewable terms, each representing an electoral district. The council is responsible for reviewing and adopting budgets and appropriations. It can also enact, repeal, or amend ordinances, and make appointments to certain boards and commissions, among other duties.

Prior to the 2015 Indianapolis City-County Council election, the council included four at-large seats, for a total of 29 seats. In 2013, the Indiana General Assembly passed Senate Enrolled Act 621 which, among other changes to city-county government, eliminated the council's four at-large seats. The controversial bill was signed into law by Governor Mike Pence.

Judicial branch
 Marion Circuit Court
 Marion Superior Court

Township government

State government

Federal government

References

External links

 www.indy.gov
 Revised Code of the Consolidated City and County Indianapolis/Marion County, Indiana from Municode